Kent Stephen Manderville (born April 12, 1971) is a Canadian former professional ice hockey player who played in the National Hockey League for the Toronto Maple Leafs, Edmonton Oilers, Hartford Whalers/Carolina Hurricanes, Philadelphia Flyers and the Pittsburgh Penguins. Manderville was born in Edmonton, Alberta.

Career
Manderville was drafted 24th overall in the second round by the Calgary Flames in the 1989 NHL Entry Draft and played for Cornell University from 1989–91. While in school Manderville also played for Canada in the World Junior Ice Hockey Championship in 1990 and 1991, winning the gold medal in both years.  Manderville left Cornell after two season to join the Canadian national team and played in the 1992 Winter Olympics where the team won the silver medal.  Following the Olympics he opted to turn professional and joined the Toronto Maple Leafs, who had obtained his rights from Calgary in a trade, for the remainder of the 1991–1992 season.

Manderville played in 646 regular season NHL games, scoring 37 goals and 67 assists for 104 points, picking up 348 penalty minutes.  He played in 67 NHL playoff games registering 3 goals and 3 assists.

On March 12, 1997, as a member of the Hartford Whalers, he scored the only hat trick of his NHL career in a 6-3 victory over the Boston Bruins.

After his NHL career, he played three seasons for Timrå IK of the Elitserien in Sweden from 2003 to 2006. His final hockey season (2006-2007) was spent with the Espoo Blues of the SM-liiga in Finland. After four years in Northern Europe he retired in 2007 and was accepted to attend law school at the University of Ottawa. He deferred admission for a year and then ultimately decided to decline the offer, instead opting to complete his Cornell University Bachelor of Science degree.  He was an analyst for televised Ottawa Senators games on A Ottawa during the 2007-08 season. In the week of June 23, 2008, he presented the sportscast for A-News at 6 and 11 pm.

He has also passed all three Chartered Financial Analyst (CFA) exams and was awarded the Certified Financial Planner (CFP) designation in September, 2020.  He is now Director of the IP Hockey Family Office which provides wealth management for hockey professionals, located in Ottawa.

Career statistics

Regular season and playoffs

International

Awards and honors

Transactions
January 2, 1992 – Traded to the Toronto Maple Leafs by the Calgary Flames with Doug Gilmour, Jamie Macoun, Rick Wamsley and Ric Nattress for Gary Leeman, Alexander Godynyuk, Jeff Reese, Michel Petit and Craig Berube.
December 4, 1995 – Traded to the Edmonton Oilers by the Toronto Maple Leafs for Peter White and Edmonton's fourth round choice (Jason Sessa) in 1996 NHL Entry Draft.
October 2, 1996 – Signed as a free agent by the Hartford Whalers.
June 25, 1997 – Transferred to the Carolina Hurricanes after the Hartford Whalers franchise relocated.
March 14, 2000 – Traded to the Philadelphia Flyers by the Carolina Hurricanes for Sandy McCarthy.
March 17, 2002 – Traded to the Pittsburgh Penguins by the Philadelphia Flyers for Billy Tibbetts.
November 21, 2003 – Signed as a free agent by the Timrå IK.
June 29, 2006 – Signed as a free agent by the Kloten Flyers.

References

External links
 

1971 births
Living people
Calgary Flames draft picks
Canadian ice hockey centres
Carolina Hurricanes players
Cornell Big Red men's ice hockey players
Edmonton Oilers players
Espoo Blues players
Hartford Whalers players
Ice hockey players at the 1992 Winter Olympics
Medalists at the 1992 Winter Olympics
Olympic ice hockey players of Canada
Olympic medalists in ice hockey
Olympic silver medalists for Canada
Philadelphia Flyers players
Pittsburgh Penguins players
St. John's Maple Leafs players
Ice hockey people from Edmonton
Springfield Falcons players
Timrå IK players
Toronto Maple Leafs players
Canadian expatriate ice hockey players in Finland
Canadian expatriate ice hockey players in Sweden